Beeton is a town in Ontario, Canada.

Beeton may also refer to:
Boyce Beeton (playing in 1960s), Australian rugby player
Lucy Beeton (1829–1886), Australian Aboriginal schoolteacher and trader
Mrs Beeton (1836–1865), Isabella Beeton, English cookery writer
Sam Beeton (born 1988), British musician
Samuel Orchart Beeton (1831–1877), British publisher and husband of Mrs Beeton

See also
Beaton (disambiguation), similar word